Taiz International Airport is a public airport located in Taiz, the capital of the Taiz Governorate, Yemen.

Airlines and destinations
As of 2021, there are no longer any scheduled services at the airport after Yemenia suspended all routes in 2015 due to the ongoing regional conflict. Previously, the airline served few domestic and international destinations from here.

Accidents and incidents
On 19 March 1969, a Douglas C-47 Skytrain 4W-AAS of Yemen Airlines crashed shortly after take-off due to an incorrectly assembled elevator trim tab which operated in the opposite manner to normal. The aircraft was operating a test flight, all four crew were killed.
On 13 December 1973, a Douglas DC-3 4W-ABR of Yemen Airlines was reported to have been damaged beyond economic repair.

References

External links

Airports in Yemen
Airport